Carlos Roberto Alves Pereira Júnior (born February 4, 1987 in Goiânia), known as just Júnior Pereira, is a Brazilian football player who currently plays for FELDA United FC as a defender in the Malaysia Super League.

References

External links
 

1987 births
Living people
Brazilian footballers
Brazilian expatriate footballers
Expatriate footballers in Malaysia
Expatriate footballers in Portugal
Campeonato Brasileiro Série B players
Campeonato Brasileiro Série C players
Malaysia Super League players
Liga Portugal 2 players
Clube Náutico Capibaribe players
Goiás Esporte Clube players
Atlético Clube Goianiense players
Trindade Atlético Clube players
Sinop Futebol Clube players
América Futebol Clube (Teófilo Otoni) players
Associação Naval 1º de Maio players
Leixões S.C. players
Felda United F.C. players
Guarany Sporting Club players
Rio Branco Esporte Clube players
Goiânia Esporte Clube players
Association football defenders
Sportspeople from Goiânia
21st-century Brazilian people